The United States participated in the 2010 Summer Youth Olympics in Singapore.

The U.S. Team consisted of 82 athletes competing in 18 sports: aquatics (swimming and diving), archery, badminton, basketball, boxing, equestrian, fencing, gymnastics, judo, modern pentathlon, sailing, table tennis, taekwondo, track & field, triathlon, volleyball, weightlifting and wrestling.

Medalists

Archery

Boys

Girls

Mixed

Athletics

Note: The athletes who do not have a "Q" next to their Qualification Rank advance to a non-medal ranking final.

Boys
Track and Road Events

Field Events

*Coleman was disqualified due to a hurdle fault resulting from a trailing leg.

Girls
Track and Road Events

Field Events

Badminton

Boys

Girls

Basketball

Boys

Girls

Boxing

Diving

Boys

Girls

Equestrian

Fencing

Group Stage

Knock-Out Stage

Gymnastics

Artistic Gymnastics

Boys

Rhythmic Gymnastics 

Individual

Trampoline

Judo

Girls

Boys

Team

Modern pentathlon

Girls

Boys

Mixed Relay

Sailing

Note: Races 11-15 were cancelled.

Girls

Boys

OCS - Off course side 
DNC - Did not come (to the starting area) (DNS)

Swimming

Boys

Girls

Mixed

Taekwondo

Women's

Men's

Table tennis

Individual

Team

Triathlon

Men's

Women's

Mixed

Volleyball

Girls

Weightlifting

Girls

Wrestling

Freestyle

Greco-Roman

References

External links

Competitors List: United States

2010 in American sports
Nations at the 2010 Summer Youth Olympics
United States at the Youth Olympics